

Administrative and municipal divisions

References

External links
Law of the Sakha Republic #352-III of November 30, 2004 On establishing the borders and granting the status of municipal districts to municipal entities of the Sakha (Yakutia) Republic 
List of administrative divisions of the Sakha Republic on the YakutiaToday.com website

Geography of the Sakha Republic
Sakha Republic